My Neighbor, Charles is a South Korean reality-variety show that airs on KBS 1TV every Tuesday at 19:35 (KST).

Synopsis
Each episode follows the daily lives of foreigners in South Korea, filmed over the span of two weeks. Daily routines, language acquisition, and culture differences are shown during the program.

Format
The show is filmed in a multiple-camera format. Cameras follow the subjects on their daily routines.

A sit-down studio interview is shown at the beginning and end of the episode.

Episodes

References

External links
  
 

Korean Broadcasting System original programming
South Korean reality television series
2010s South Korean television series
Korean-language television shows
South Korean variety television shows
Multiculturalism in South Korea